Natalya Panteleyeva (born 10 September 1983) is a Russian middle distance runner who specializes in the 800 metres and 1500 metres.

On 11 February 2007 she helped establish a world indoor record in the rarely contested 4 x 800 metres relay (8:18.54 minutes with teammates Anna Balakshina, Anna Emashova and Olesya Chumakova).

She won the silver medal in 1500 m at the 2007 European Indoor Athletics Championships.

Personal bests
800 metres - 1:59.21 min (2006)
1500 metres - 4:00.81 min (2006)

See also
List of European Athletics Indoor Championships medalists (women)

References

 
 EAA profile

1983 births
Living people
Russian female middle-distance runners
Russian Athletics Championships winners